Torre Mapfre is a skyscraper in the Port Olímpic (Olympic Port), the maritime neighborhood of the Old City of Barcelona in Spain.  It is named after its owner, Mapfre, an insurance company.

Also present in the tower are: Haufe Group, Kantox, ExoClick, Dorlet, Europerfil, Madrid Leasing (CAJA MADRID),  Condal Grues, URSSA (Mondragón Corporation), Flex Multimedia Advertising SL (Flex Multimedia Group LTD), Kofax, Oriol Bohigues, Necso, Uniland Cementera S.A, Cementos Portland Valderrivas, Zardoya Otis, Texsa S.A, Oliver Wyman, Criteo.

Unlike its twin, Hotel Arts, this tower is a mixed use tower.

See also 
List of skyscrapers in Spain
 Torre Agbar, third-tallest building in Barcelona

References

External links 

 Building data provided by Emporis

Skyscraper office buildings in Barcelona
Office buildings completed in 1992